The Road Less Traveled, or simply Road Less Traveled, may refer to:

Music
 The Road Less Traveled (George Strait album), 2001
 The Road Less Travelled (Graeme Connors album), 1996
 The Road Less Travelled (Preston Reed album), 1987
 The Road Less Traveled (Six Feet Deep album), 1997
 The Road Less Travelled (Triosphere album), 2010
 Greatest Hits: The Road Less Traveled, a 2005 album by Melissa Etheridge
 Road Less Traveled (Boyce Avenue album), 2016
 "Road Less Traveled" (song), a 2015 song by Lauren Alaina
 Road Less Traveled (Lauren Alaina album), 2017
 Road Less Traveled (Points North album), 2012
 "Road Less Traveled", song by Sick of It All from The Last Act of Defiance, 2014

Other uses
 The Road Less Traveled, a 1978 popular book of psychology and spirituality by M. Scott Peck
 "The Road Less Traveled" (The Twilight Zone), a 1986 episode of the television series The New Twilight Zone
 "The Road Less Traveled" (Battlestar Galactica), a 2008 episode of the television series Battlestar Galactica
 "The Road Less Traveled", a 2016 episode of the television series The Man in the High Castle

See also
 "The Road Not Taken", a 1915 Robert Frost poem
 The Road We've Traveled, a 2012 documentary film about Barack Obama's presidency